Barwa is a village located in the Bali tehsil of Pali district of Rajasthan state, amidst the Aravalli Range. It is dominated by Rajpurohit (gundecha). It is said that the rajpurohit gundecha migrated from chittaurgarh (mewar) to godawd in 15th century than Thakur Badh singh ji gundecha of Chandrayat lineage of Mada established Barwa. The village is divided into five poll (gates) namely Korka poll, Darvaja poll, gopal poll, Badi poll, Th. Jethu Singji poll. Barwa is one of the most flourish village in the pali district. The village and the surrounding area was controlled by the rajpurohit (Gundecha's) till independence (for around 600 years) and it is one of the most popular villages in Pali district this jagir was granted by Mewar kingdom to gundechas for their bravery in military campaigns.

Demographics
The population of Barwa is 2,874 according to the 2001 census, where male population is 1,396 and female population is 1,478.

There are many temples in the village like Shree Lakshmi Narayan Temple, Shree Vishwakarma MANDIR  Shree Mahadevji Temple, Shree Sariyadeviji Temple, Shree Charbhuja Mandir, Thakurji Mandir (Badipaul), Shree Rohinimataji, Satimata, Vageshvari mataji. 

hanuman temple Kika Doly, Kala Bheru, Gora Bheru, Shitla Mata Mandir.
The famous pilgrim of Shree Aatmanadji Samadhi.

The main leader in Barwa Narayan singh Rajpurohit ( kaku ).

External links
Website of Barwa 

Villages in Pali district